Astyra, also known as Astyrum or Astyron (Ἄστυρον), and perhaps also Andeira (Ἀνδειρα), was a small town of ancient Aeolis and of Mysia, in the Plain of Thebe, between Antandrus and Adramyttium. It had a temple of Artemis, of which the Antandrii had the superintendence. Artemis had hence the name of Astyrene or Astirene. There was a lake Sapra near Astyra, which communicated with the sea. Pausanias, from his own observations, describes a spring of black water at Astyra; the water was hot. But he places Astyra in the territory of Atarneus. There was, then, either a place in Atarneus called Astyra, with warm springs, or Pausanias has made some mistake; for there is no doubt about the position of the Astyra of Strabo and Pomponius Mela. Astyra was a deserted place, according to Pliny's authorities; he calls it Astyre. There are said to be coins of Astyra.

It was a member of the Delian League.

Its site is tentatively located near Büyük Çal Tepe, Balıkesir Province, Turkey.

References

Populated places in ancient Aeolis
Populated places in ancient Mysia
Former populated places in Turkey
Members of the Delian League
Ancient Greek archaeological sites in Turkey
History of Balıkesir Province